Junqueras is a Catalan surname. Notable people with the surname include:

Juan Junqueras (1900-1938), Spanish sprinter
Oriol Junqueras (born 1969), Spanish politician

Catalan-language surnames